Latvia participated in and won the Eurovision Song Contest 2002 with the song "I Wanna" written by Marija Naumova and Marats Samauskis. The song was performed by Marie N, which is the artistic name of singer Marija Naumova. The Latvian broadcaster Latvijas Televīzija (LTV) organised the national final Eirodziesma 2002 in order to select the Latvian entry for the 2002 contest in Tallinn, Estonia. Fifteen songs were selected to compete in the national final on 2 March 2002 where a public televote exclusively selected "I Wonna" performed by Marija Naumova as the winner. The song was later retitled as "I Wanna" for the Eurovision Song Contest.

Latvia competed in the Eurovision Song Contest which took place on 25 May 2002. Performing during the show in position 23, Latvia placed first out of the 24 participating countries, winning the contest with 176 points. This was Latvia's first win in the Eurovision Song Contest.

Background 

Prior to the 2002 contest, Latvia had participated in the Eurovision Song Contest two times since its first entry in 2000 with the song "My Star" performed by Brainstorm which placed 3rd. In the 2001 contest, Latvia placed 18th with the song "Too Much" performed by Arnis Mednis. The Latvian national broadcaster, Latvijas Televīzija (LTV), broadcasts the event within Latvia and organises the selection process for the nation's entry. Since their debut in 2000, LTV had organised the selection show Eirodziesma, a selection procedure that was continued in order to select the Latvian entry for the 2002 contest.

Before Eurovision

Eirodziesma 2002 
Eirodziesma 2002 was the third edition of Eirodziesma, the music competition that selects Latvia's entries for the Eurovision Song Contest. The competition took place at the Olympic Center in Ventspils on 2 March 2002, hosted by Ija Circene and Ēriks Niedra and broadcast on LTV1.

Competing entries 
Artists and songwriters were able to submit their entries to the broadcaster between 15 October 2001 and 30 November 2001. A record 68 entries were submitted at the conclusion of the submission period. A jury panel appointed by LTV evaluated the submitted songs and selected fifteen entries for the competition. The jury panel consisted of Munro Forbes (British television director and music manager), Kato Hansen (representative of OGAE Norway), Dave Benton (Estonian Eurovision Song Contest 2001 winner), Gediminas Žujus (Lithuanian producer and composer), Antero Päiväläinen (Finnish producer and representative of Taurus Music), Ólöf Jónsdóttir (Eurovision expert at the Iceland Music Information Centre), Sinia Koussolla (Greek music expert), Jørgen Olsen (Danish Eurovision Song Contest 2000 winner) and Brainstorm (2000 Latvian Eurovision entrant). The fifteen competing artists and songs were announced during a press conference on 14 December 2001.

Final 
The final took place on 2 March 2002. Fifteen acts competed and the song with the highest number of votes from the public, "I Wonna" performed by Marija Naumova, was declared the winner. A preliminary vote by a jury panel and the Latvian public prior to the final also selected Marija Naumova as the winner.

At Eurovision 
According to Eurovision rules, all nations with the exceptions of the bottom six countries in the 2001 contest competed in the final. On 9 November 2001, a special allocation draw was held which determined the running order and Latvia was set to perform in position 23, following the entry from the Slovenia and before the entry from Lithuania. The Latvian performance was largely credited for its stage presentation and choreography between Marie N and her backing performers, and the nation won the contest placing first with a score of 176 points. This was Latvia's first victory in the Eurovision Song Contest.

The show was broadcast in Latvia on LTV1 featuring commentary by Kārlis Streips. The Latvian spokesperson, who announced the Latvian votes during the final, was Ēriks Niedra.

Voting 
Below is a breakdown of points awarded to Latvia and awarded by Latvia in the contest. The nation awarded its 12 points to Estonia in the contest.

References 

2002
Countries in the Eurovision Song Contest 2002
Eurovision